Linda Burnes Bolton is an American nurse and healthcare administrator. She is the vice president and chief nursing officer at Cedars-Sinai Medical Center and has served as president of the American Academy of Nursing, the American Organization of Nurse Executives and the National Black Nurses Association. She is a member of the National Academy of Medicine.

Biography
Burnes Bolton grew up in Tucson and became interested in nursing at the age of seven, having suffered from severe asthma and requiring frequent hospitalizations. She earned an undergraduate nursing degree from Arizona State University. She completed three graduate degrees at UCLA - master's degrees in nursing and public health and a doctorate in public health. She is the Vice President for Nursing, Chief Nursing Officer, and Director of Nursing Research at Cedars-Sinai Medical Center.

Burnes Bolton is a past president of the American Academy of Nursing, the American Organization of Nurse Executives (AONE) and the National Black Nurses Association. She served as vice-chair of the Institute of Medicine Committee on the Future of Nursing. She was named to the Board of Trustees at Case Western Reserve University in 2007. In 2012, she was elected a trustee of the Robert Wood Johnson Foundation. Burnes Bolton is on the editorial board of the American Journal of Nursing.

Before she was elected president of the AONE, the organization presented her with its Lifetime Achievement Award. In 2011, Modern Healthcare named her to its Top 25 Women in Healthcare. She received an honorary doctorate from the SUNY Upstate Medical University in 2015. That year, she was elected to the National Academy of Medicine. She won the 2016 Professional Achievement Award from the UCLA Alumni Association and was the 2016 recipient of the TRUST Award from the American Hospital Association.

References

Living people
American nursing administrators
Arizona State University alumni
UCLA School of Nursing alumni
People from Tucson, Arizona
UCLA School of Public Health alumni
Year of birth missing (living people)
American women nurses
21st-century American women
Members of the National Academy of Medicine